Jesús María is a city in the Mexican state of Aguascalientes.

As of 2010, the city of Jesús María had a population of 43,012, making it the second largest city in the state. It is located so close to the state capital city of Aguascalientes, Aguascalientes, that it has been swallowed by it, rendering it part of the Aguascalientes metropolitan area (pop. 805,666 in 2005), with the function of a suburban area.

It is also the sister city of Queen Creek, Arizona, United States

Climate

References

Link to tables of population data from Census of 2005 Instituto Nacional de Estadística, Geografía e Informática (INEGI)
Aguascalientes Enciclopedia de los Municipios de México

External links

Municipio de Jesús María Official website
Gobierno del Estado de Aguascalientes Official website of state of Aguascalientes

Populated places in Aguascalientes

fr:Jesús María (Aguascalientes)
it:Jesús María (Aguascalientes)